Licensed to Kill may refer to:

 Licensed to Kill (1965 film), a British imitation James Bond movie starring Tom Adams
 Licensed to Kill (1997 film), an American documentary by Arthur Dong
 Licensed to Kill? The Nuclear Regulatory Commission and the Shoreham Power Plant, a 1998 book by Joan Aron

See also 
 Licence to Kill (disambiguation)